Robert George Goalby (March 14, 1929 – January 19, 2022) was an American professional golfer.  He won the Masters Tournament in 1968, after Roberto De Vicenzo notably made an error on his scorecard.  It was Goalby's lone major championship among 11 Tour wins achieved between 1958 and 1971.

Early life
Goalby was born in Belleville, Illinois on March 14, 1929. There he was raised, and lived for much of his life. He was the son of a coal miner, the family had little money and he would sneak over the fence of nearby St Clair Country Club to indulge his love for golf and also worked as a caddie at the course. He excelled in athletics during his time at Belleville Township High School earning 11 varsity letters. Notably, he was a catcher and pitcher on the Illinois High School Association(IHSA) championship Baseball Team his junior year and an All-State quarterback during his senior year of High School and attended the University of Illinois, on a football scholarship only to lose his eligibility due to playing several baseball games for Southern Illinois University, and quit college altogether. He served in the United States military during the Korean War.

Career
Goalby turned professional in 1957 with his first Tour win coming in 1958, he earned the PGA Tour Rookie of the Year Award in that season. He won and contended steadily until 1971, when he was 42 years old. At the 1968 Masters, Goalby tied Roberto De Vicenzo at the end of 72 holes of regulation play, and would have had to face an 18-hole playoff the next day, had there not been a mistake on DeVicenzo's scorecard. In the final round, DeVicenzo's playing partner Tommy Aaron marked a par-4 on the 17th hole, when DeVicenzo had in fact made a birdie-3. DeVicenzo failed to catch the mistake and signed the scorecard. The rules of golf state that the higher written score signed by a golfer on his card must stand and as such, the error gave Goalby the championship. Goalby, playing in the group behind DeVicenzo, was not personally at fault for anything in the incident. The story received overwhelming attention at the time, and has remained high in public consciousness since. It was recounted in great detail in the 2005 book The Lost Masters: Grace and Disgrace in '68 by Curt Sampson. The personal relationship between Goalby and DeVicenzo was unaffected by the difficult situation, and the two players formed a partnership years later, for a team event on the Champions Tour.

Goalby played on the Ryder Cup team in 1963 and retired from the PGA Tour after winning 11 tournaments. He joined the Senior PGA Tour (now the Champions Tour) in 1979, winning twice, and contributed key ideas to the formation and structure of that new Tour, before retiring to a home in his native Belleville, where he has designed several nearby golf courses. He also served as a golf commentator for NBC television for 14 years.

Legacy
Goalby lent his name each year since 1982 to a charity golf tournament, the Bob Goalby Golf Open, for the benefit of Maur Hill - Mount Academy, a Catholic, international, college preparatory school in Atchison, Kansas. The football stadium at Belleville High School-West was dedicated to him on October 13, 2017. , Goalby resided in Palm Desert, California and was inducted of the St. Louis Sports Hall Of Fame, the Belleville Walk of Fame, and Illinois Golf Hall of Fame.

Personal life
Goalby had three sons: Kye, Kel and Kevin, the former of whom is a golf course architect. Goalby's nephew Jay Haas is a 9-time PGA Tour winner, and another nephew, Jerry Haas, coaches the Wake Forest University golf team. His great-nephew, Bill Haas, plays on the PGA Tour, and won the Tour Championship tournament and FedEx Cup in 2011. Goalby died in Belleville on January 19, 2022, at the age of 92.

Professional wins (14)

PGA Tour wins (11)

PGA Tour playoff record (2–1)

Source:

Senior PGA Tour wins (2)

Senior PGA Tour playoff record (0–1)

Source:

Other senior wins (1)
1983 Shootout at Jeremy Ranch (with Mike Reid)

Major championships

Wins (1)

Results timeline

Note: Goalby never played in The Open Championship.

CUT = missed the halfway cut
"T" indicates a tie for a place.

Source:

Summary

Source:
Most consecutive cuts made – 9 (1971 PGA – 1974 Masters)
Longest streak of top-10s – 3 (1967 U.S. Open – 1968 Masters)

U.S. national team appearances
Professional
Ryder Cup: 1963 (winners)

References

External links

1929 births
2022 deaths
American male golfers
PGA Tour golfers
PGA Tour Champions golfers
Winners of men's major golf championships
Ryder Cup competitors for the United States
Golf course architects
Golf writers and broadcasters
Golfers from Illinois
Sportspeople from Belleville, Illinois
Sportspeople from Palm Springs, California